Drewry Secondary School  (abbreviated Drewry SS, DSS, or Drewry); formerly known as Lewis S. Beattie Vocational School and Lewis S. Beattie Secondary School is a small specialized vocational secondary school in Toronto, Ontario, Canada. It is located in the Newtonbrook neighborhood of the former suburb of North York. It was operated by the North York Board of Education until its merger into the Toronto District School Board. Since 1989, the school is housed in the former elementary school building.

History

The original school was established in 1966 for the North York Board of Education as Lewis S. Beattie at 110 Drewry Avenue and in 1989, the school moved to the former Drewry Elementary School with the former site becoming École secondaire catholique Monseigneur-de-Charbonnel. The school was originally named for Lewis Stanley Beattie,  superintendent of secondary education for the province of Ontario.

References

External links
 Drewry Secondary School
 TDSB Profile

High schools in Toronto
Educational institutions established in 1966
Schools in the TDSB
1966 establishments in Ontario